The Kitchener-Waterloo Siskins are a junior ice hockey team based in Waterloo, Ontario, Canada.  They play in the Mid-Western division of the Greater Ontario Junior Hockey League.

History

Founded in 1934, the Siskins are one of the longest running Junior teams in hockey history. The team took a short hiatus in World War II. In the 1950s, the team was a part of what was then known as the "Big 10", and in 1956 was allocated in the Central "B". As part of the 1971 geographic realignment, the Siskins moved to the Western Junior B league. In 1973, the Siskins joined the Southwestern "B", which became the Waterloo-Wellington "B" in 1974, and the Midwestern "B" in 1977. The Siskins have always been a competitive team, and together with the Stratford Cullitons dominated the league for much of its first 20 years. The Siskins still operate in the Midwestern "B" to this day.

Since 1977, the Siskins have won 8 league championships and 6 Sutherland Cups as Ontario Hockey Association Junior "B" Champions. They have only had four losing records and have been regular season champions 4 times. Prior to 1977, the Siskins had won 6 Sutherland Cups for a total of 12, a record.

In 2019, the Siskins faced off against the London Nationals for the Sutherland Cup. The Siskins would go on to beat the London Nationals in game seven on an overtime goal scored by Alec Tiley giving the Siskins their 12th Sutherland Cup in team history. It was the first time in 25 years that the team had become Sutherland Cup Champions.

In 2020 after the Departure of the Kitchener Dutchmen from the area, the team changed its name to the KW Siskins.

Season-by-season record
{|class="wikitable"
|- align="center" bgcolor="#dddddd"
|-
! Season !! GP !! W !! L !! T !! OTL !! GF !! GA !! Pts !! Results !! Playoffs
|- align="center"
|1938-39	||9     ||7    ||2    ||0   ||-    ||--    ||--     ||14   ||2nd OHA Gr.||
|- align="center"
|1940-41	||10    ||3    ||7    ||0   ||-    ||40    ||60     ||6    ||4th OHA Gr.||
|- align="center"
|1941-42	||14    ||6    ||8    ||0   ||-    ||56    ||50     ||12   ||2nd OHA Gr.||
|- align="center"
|1944-45	||12    ||6    ||5    ||1   ||-    ||45    ||43     ||13   ||2nd OHA Gr.||
|- align="center"
|1945-46	||11    ||9    ||2    ||0   ||-    ||72    ||37     ||18	||1st OHA Gr.||Won League
|- align="center"
|1946-47	||12    ||1    ||10   ||1   ||-    ||25    ||58     ||3	||8th OHA Gr.||
|- align="center"
|1947-48	||12    ||6    ||6    ||0   ||-    ||61    ||61     ||12	||5th OHA Gr.||
|- align="center"
|1948-49	||16    ||10   ||5    ||1   ||-    ||99    ||85     ||21	||4th OHA Gr.||Lost Final
|- align="center"
|1949-50	||20    ||4    ||15   ||1   ||-    ||101   ||128    ||9	||7th OHA Gr.||
|- align="center"
|1950-51	||15    ||6    ||8    ||1   ||-    ||70    ||85     ||13	||4th OHA Gr.||
|- align="center"
|1951-52	||20    ||17   ||3    ||0   ||-    ||179   ||83     ||34	||1st OHA Gr. ||Won League
|- align="center"
|1952-53	||19    ||14   ||3    ||2   ||-    ||119   ||61     ||30	||1st OHA Gr. ||Won League
|- align="center"
|1953-54	||32    ||28   ||2    ||2   ||-    ||236   ||104    ||58	||1st OHA Gr. ||Won League, Won SC
|- align="center"
|1954-55	||30    ||22   ||8    ||0   ||-    ||194   ||123    ||44	||2nd CJBHL ||
|- align="center"
|1955-56	||27    ||22   ||5    ||0   ||-    ||205   ||90     ||44	||1st CJBHL ||Won League, Won SC
|- align="center"
|1956-57	||27    ||16   ||10   ||1   ||-    ||135   ||122    ||33	||3rd CJBHL ||
|- align="center"
|1957-58	||28    ||12   ||16   ||0   ||-    ||147   ||161    ||24	||5th CJBHL ||
|- align="center"
|1958-59	||30    ||22   ||8    ||0   ||-    ||287   ||129    ||44	||1st CJBHL ||Won League, Won SC
|- align="center"
|1959-60	||29    ||17   ||11   ||1   ||-    ||--    ||--     ||35	||3rd CJBHL ||Won League
|- align="center"
|1960-61	||30    ||18   ||10   ||2   ||-    ||210   ||175    ||38	||2nd CJBHL ||
|- align="center"
|1961-62	||30    ||23   ||6    ||1   ||-    ||231   ||127    ||47    ||2nd CJBHL ||Won League, Won SC
|- align="center"
|1962-63	||36    ||22   ||13   ||1   ||-    ||185   ||167    ||45	||2nd CJBHL ||Won League
|- align="center"
|1963-64	||35    ||23   ||11   ||1   ||-    ||202   ||152    ||47	||2nd CJBHL ||Won League, Won SC
|- align="center"
|1964-65	||42    ||22   ||19   ||1   ||-    ||196   ||179    ||45	||2nd CJBHL ||
|- align="center"
|1965-66	||39    ||14   ||24   ||1   ||-    ||198   ||235    ||29	||5th CJBHL ||
|- align="center"
|1966-67	||32    ||20   ||12   ||0   ||-    ||218   ||165    ||40	||2nd CJBHL ||
|- align="center"
|1967-68	||39    ||21   ||17   ||1   ||-    ||234   ||222    ||43	||2nd CJBHL ||
|- align="center"
|1968-69	||36    ||16   ||16   ||4   ||-    ||156   ||174    ||36	||5th CJBHL ||
|- align="center"
|1969-70	||40    ||14   ||23   ||3   ||-    ||157   ||188    ||31	||4th CJBHL ||
|- align="center"
|1970-71	||41    ||3    ||35   ||3   ||-    ||124   ||338    ||9 	||5th CJBHL ||
|- align="center"
|1971-72	||40    ||11   ||21   ||8   ||-    ||150   ||205    ||30  ||6th WOJHL  ||
|- align="center"
|1972-73	||42    ||6    ||31   ||5   ||-    ||167   ||284    ||17  ||8th WOJHL  ||
|- align="center"
|1973-74	||40    ||23   ||12   ||5   ||-    ||224   ||168    ||51    ||1st SWJBHL||
|- align="center"
|1974-75	||40    ||26   ||9    ||5   ||-    ||247   ||171    ||57    ||1st WWJHL    ||Won League
|- align="center"
|1975-76||42    ||27   ||10   ||5   ||-    ||298   ||200    ||59  ||2nd WWJHL ||Won League
|- align="center"
|1976-77||40    ||21   ||16   ||3   ||-    ||227   ||195    ||45  ||2nd WWJHL ||
|- align="center"
|1977-78||40||23|| 8|| 9||-||203||148||55||2nd MWJBHL||Lost Final
|- align="center"
|1978-79||42||22||18|| 2||-||227||210||46||3rd MWJBHL||Lost Semi-final
|- align="center"
|1979-80||42||32|| 8|| 2||-||313||159||66||2nd MWJBHL||Won League
|- align="center"
|1980-81||42||29||11|| 2||-||234||159||60||2nd MWJBHL||Lost Semi-final
|- align="center"
|1981-82||42||26||16|| 0||-||229||162||52||4th MWJBHL||Lost Semi-final
|- align="center"
|1982-83||42||28||10|| 4||-||236||156||60||1st MWJBHL||Lost Final
|- align="center"
|1983-84||42||37|| 4|| 1||-||336||129||75||1st MWJBHL||Won League, Won SC
|- align="center"
|1984-85||42||34|| 8|| 0||-||269||139||68||1st MWJBHL||Won League, Won SC
|- align="center"
|1985-86||40||29||11|| 0||-||271||147||58||2nd MWJBHL||Lost Final
|- align="center"
|1986-87||42||31|| 9|| 2||-||242||125||64||2nd MWJBHL||Lost Semi-final
|- align="center"
|1987-88||48||40|| 7|| 1||-||329||147||81||1st MWJBHL||Won League, Won SC
|- align="center"
|1988-89||48||43|| 5|| 0||-||345||130||86||2nd MWJBHL||Won League
|- align="center"
|1989-90||48||33||12|| 3||-||258||140||69||3rd MWJBHL||Lost Final
|- align="center"
|1990-91||48||32||16|| 0||-||257||162||64||3rd MWJBHL||Won League, Won SC
|- align="center"
|1991-92||48||34||12|| 2||-||242||146||70||2nd MWJBHL||Lost Semi-final
|- align="center"
|1992-93||48||29||19|| 0||-||263||210||58||4th MWJBHL||Lost Semi-final
|- align="center"
|1993-94||48||30||17|| 1||-||256||155||61||3rd MWJBHL||Won League, Won SC
|- align="center"
|1994-95||48||26||17|| 5||-||194||154||57||4th MWJBHL||Lost Quarter-final
|- align="center"
|1995-96||48||33||12|| 3||-||258||156||69||2nd MWJBHL||Lost Quarter-final
|- align="center"
|1996-97||48||28||15|| 5||-||189||162||61||5th MWJBHL||Lost Semi-final
|- align="center"
|1997-98||48||32||11|| 5||-||252||143||69||3rd MWJBHL||Lost Semi-final
|- align="center"
|1998-99||48||27||18|| 3||-||213||161||57||4th MWJBHL||Lost Quarter-final
|- align="center"
|1999-00||47||25||20|| 2||-||178||134||52||6th MWJBHL||Lost Quarter-final
|- align="center"
|2000-01||48||28||15|| 5||-||193||159||61||4th MWJBHL||Lost Quarter-final
|- align="center"
|2001-02||48||24||19|| 5||-||181||165||53||5th MWJBHL||
|- align="center"
|2002-03||48||17||25|| 6|| 4||180||167||44||7th MWJBHL||
|- align="center"
|2003-04||48||26||18|| 3|| 1||203||194||56||5th MWJBHL||
|- align="center"
|2004-05||48||28||11|| 6|| 3||216||151||65||4th MWJBHL||
|- align="center"
|2005-06||48||15||29|| 4||-||143||183||34||8th MWJBHL||Lost Quarter-final
|- align="center"
|2006-07||48||16||26|| 4|| 2||148||184||38||8th MWJBHL||Lost Quarter-final
|- align="center" bgcolor="#eeeeff"
|2007-08     ||48    ||17   ||21   ||8   ||2    ||172   ||181    ||44	||8th GOJHL-MW  ||Lost Conf. QF
|- align="center" bgcolor="#eeeeff"
|2008-09	||52    ||33   ||15   ||-   ||4    ||214   ||154    ||70	||3rd GOJHL-MW||Lost Conf. SF
|- align="center" bgcolor="#eeeeff"
|2009-10	||51    ||43   ||7    ||-   ||1    ||221   ||116    ||87    ||2nd GOJHL-MW  ||Lost Conf. SF
|- align="center" bgcolor="#eeeeff"
|2010-11	||51    ||15   ||31   ||-   ||5    ||143   ||229    ||35    ||8th GOJHL-MW  ||Lost Conf. QF
|- align="center" bgcolor="#eeeeff"
|2011-12	||51    ||17   ||30   ||-   ||4    ||155   ||243    ||38    ||7th GOJHL-MW  ||Lost Conf. QF
|- align="center" bgcolor="#eeeeff"
|2012-13	||51    ||27   ||18   ||-   ||6    ||211   ||171    ||60    ||4th GOJHL-MW  ||
|- align="center" bgcolor="#eeeeff"
|2013-14	||49    ||34   ||12   ||-   ||3    ||175   ||129    ||71    ||3rd GOJHL-MW  ||Won Conf. Quarter-final, 4-1 (Hurricanes) Won Conf. Semi-final, 4-3 (Sugar Kings)  Won Conf. Final, 4-2 (Cullitons)

Cherrey Cup Champions

Lost Sutherland Semifinals, 1-4 (Corvairs)
|- align="center" bgcolor="#eeeeff"
|2014-15	||49    ||31   ||12   ||-   ||6    ||208   ||142    ||38    ||4th GOJHL-MW  ||Won Conf. Quarter-final, 4-0 (Hurricanes) Lost Conf. Semi-final, 0-4 (Sugar Kings)
|- align="center" bgcolor="#eeeeff"
|2015-16	||50    ||20   ||27   ||0   ||3    ||148   ||198    ||43    ||6th of 9-MW18th of 26-GOJHL  ||Won Conf. Quarter-final, 4-0 (Cyclones) Won Conf. Semi-final, 4-1 (Dutchmen)Lost Conf. Finals, 1-4 (Cullitons)Wildcard advanceLost Sutherland Semifinals, 0-4 (Corvairs)
|- align="center" bgcolor="#eeeeff"
|2016-17	||50    ||28   ||17   ||1   ||4    ||183   ||160    ||61   ||4th of 9-MW11th of 27-GOJHL  ||Won Conf. Quarter-final, 4-2 (Winter Hawks)Lost Conf. Semi-finals, 0-4 (Cyclones)
|- align="center" bgcolor="#eeeeff"
|2017-18	||50    ||25   ||21   ||1   ||3    ||190   ||187    ||54   ||4th of 8-MW13th of 26-GOJHL  ||Won Conf. Quarter-final, 4-3 (Dutchmen)Lost Conf. Semifinal 3-4 (Cyclones)
|- align="center" bgcolor="#eeeeff"
|2018-19	||48    ||32   ||13   ||0   ||3    ||219  ||143    ||67   ||3rd of 8-MW8th of 26-GOJHL  ||Won Conf. Quarter-final, 4-1 (Redhawks)Won Conf. Semifinal 4-2 (Warriors)Won Conf. Final 4-2 (Cyclones)Cherrey Cup ChampionsWon Sutherland Cup Semifinals, 4-2 (Canucks)Won Sutherland Cup Final, 4-3 (Nationals)Sutherland Cup Champions
|- align="center" bgcolor="#eeeeff"
|2019-20	||50    ||21   ||26   ||0   ||3    ||132  ||148    ||45   ||6th of 8-MW16th of 26-GOJHL  ||Lost Conf. Quarter-final, 2-4 (Redhawks)
|- align="center" bgcolor="beige"
|2020-21	||colspan"10"  |Season cancelled due to covid-19 pandemic
|- align="center" bgcolor="#eeeeff"
|2021-22	||48    ||31   ||15   ||5  ||0    ||185  ||129    ||67   ||3rd of 8-MW7th of 25-GOJHL  ||Won Conf. Quarter-final, 4-0 (Cyclones)Lost Conf. Semifinals, 3-4 (Redhawks)
|}

Sutherland Cup appearances1940: Waterloo Siskins defeated Owen Sound Greys 3-games-to-11952: Weston Dukes defeated Waterloo Siskins 4-games-to-11953: Weston Dukes defeated Waterloo Siskins 4-games-to-3 with 2 ties1954: Waterloo Siskins defeated Weston Dukes 4-games-to-31956: Waterloo Siskins defeated Brampton Regents 4-games-to-1 with 1 tie1960: Waterloo Siskins defeated Toronto Marlboros 4-games-to-2 with 1 tie1962: Waterloo Siskins defeated St. Thomas Barons 4-games-to-11964: Waterloo Siskins defeated Weston Dodgers 4-games-to-11984: Waterloo Siskins defeated Streetsville Derbys 4-games-to-31985: Waterloo Siskins defeated Bramalea Blues 4-games-to-11988: Waterloo Siskins defeated Bramalea Blues 4-games-to-11991: Waterloo Siskins defeated Oakville Blades 4-games-to-none1994: Waterloo Siskins defeated St. Catharines Falcons 4-games-to-22019: Waterloo Siskins defeated London Nationals 4-games-to-3''

Notable alumni
Jamie Allison
Don Awrey
Don Beaupre
Kevin Brown
Eric Calder
Larry Courville
Cole Jarrett
Larry Johnston
Jim Lorentz
George Martin
Gerry Ouellette
Rosaire Paiement
Ryan Parent
Tanner Pearson
Joel Prpic
Steven Rice
John Mitchell
George Hainsworth
Duanne Moeser

References

External links
Siskins Webpage
GOJHL Webpage

Ice hockey teams in Ontario
Sport in Waterloo, Ontario